List of V episodes may refer to:

 List of V (1984 TV series) episodes
 List of V (2009 TV series) episodes